Emil Sigvardsen Lyng (born 3 August 1989) is a Danish former professional footballer who played as a winger and a forward.

Career
Lyng began his youth career playing for Kolding FC, but later moved to city rival Kolding IF and played there until he was picked up by AGF Aarhus. In January 2008 he was promoted to the AGF first team, but never got his Danish League debut for the club before he was sold to Lille OSC in the summer of 2008. He made his senior debut for Lille on 18 October 2008 against Olympique Lyon. On 27 January 2010 Zulte Waregem signed the Danish forward on loan from Lille for 6 months.

On 7 February 2010 he got his debut at home against Club Bruges in the Jupiler League, playing as center forward. Lyng showed great composure in front of goal, as he headed his team into the lead. On 26 January 2011, Emil Lyng joined Danish club FC Nordsjælland on loan for the rest of the 2010-11 season, making 4 appearances and scoring 1 goal.

Lyng was allowed to leave Lille on a free transfer during the 2011 summer transfer window to join Swiss side Lausanne-Sports, where he signed a two-year contract and was given the number 28 shirt. He subsequently played for Danish clubs Esbjerg fB and Silkeborg IF, and had a spell with Icelandic side KA, before moving to Scottish Championship side Dundee United on a short-term deal in January 2018. He scored his first goal for his new club later that month in a Scottish Cup tie against Alloa Athletic, which United won 2-0. Lyng was released in May 2018, following the end of his contract.

On 23 January 2020, Lyng joined Middelfart G&BK in the Danish 2nd Division. He announced his retirement from football after the 2020–21 season.

After his career, he became a football agent.

Career statistics

References

External links
 
 
 

1989 births
Living people
People from Kolding
Danish men's footballers
Denmark under-21 international footballers
Danish expatriate men's footballers
Association football midfielders
Ligue 1 players
Belgian Pro League players
Danish Superliga players
Swiss Super League players
Úrvalsdeild karla (football) players
Scottish Professional Football League players
Nemzeti Bajnokság I players
Kolding IF players
Aarhus Gymnastikforening players
Lille OSC players
S.V. Zulte Waregem players
FC Nordsjælland players
FC Lausanne-Sport players
Esbjerg fB players
Silkeborg IF players
Knattspyrnufélag Akureyrar players
Dundee United F.C. players
Szombathelyi Haladás footballers
Valur (men's football) players
Middelfart Boldklub players
Danish expatriate sportspeople in Belgium
Danish expatriate sportspeople in France
Danish expatriate sportspeople in Switzerland
Danish expatriate sportspeople in Iceland
Danish expatriate sportspeople in Scotland
Danish expatriate sportspeople in Hungary
Expatriate footballers in Belgium
Expatriate footballers in France
Expatriate footballers in Switzerland
Expatriate footballers in Iceland
Expatriate footballers in Scotland
Expatriate footballers in Hungary
Sportspeople from the Region of Southern Denmark
Association football agents